In mathematics, the big q-Jacobi polynomials  Pn(x;a,b,c;q), introduced by , are a family of basic hypergeometric orthogonal polynomials in the basic Askey scheme.  give a detailed list of their properties.

Definition

The  polynomials are given in terms of basic hypergeometric functions  by

References

Orthogonal polynomials
Q-analogs
Special hypergeometric functions